"Silhouettes" is a song written by the Scottish experimental rock group Marmaduke Duke. It is included on their second album 'Duke Pandemonium and was released as a single on 6 July 2009. The single release of Silhouettes will be a remix version by Jacknife Lee. This version was first played by Zane Lowe on BBC Radio One in May 2009 with a preview being added to the bands Myspace page soon after.

A video has been filmed which is set to continue the story of the Duke as shown in videos for previous singles 'Kid Gloves' and 'Rubber Lover'.

References

External links

2009 singles
Marmaduke Duke songs
2009 songs
14th Floor Records singles